This is a list of games for the Xbox video game console.

Games
There are a total of  titles on this list. See Lists of video games for other platform lists.

For a chronological list, click the sort button in any of the available region's column. Games dated November 15, 2001 (NA), February 22, 2002 (JP), and March 14, 2002 (EU) are launch titles of each region respectively.

Games that are compatible with the Xbox 360 require a software update to play.

See also
 List of best-selling Xbox video games
 List of Xbox network games

Video game lists by platform